The IFT Industrial Scientist Award was awarded by the Institute of Food Technologists (IFT) for scientists who made significant technical contributions to advancing the food industry. It was first awarded in 1994, but was not necessarily awarded every year. In 2019, the IFT reorganized its awards program, and no longer offered this award.

Award winners received a USD 3000 honorarium and a plaque from IFT.

Winners

References

External links 
List of past winners - Official site

Food technology awards